Anochetus longifossatus, is a species of ant of the subfamily Ponerinae, which can be found from Sri Lanka.

References

External links

 at antwiki.org
Animaldiversity.org
Itis.org

Ponerinae
Hymenoptera of Asia
Insects described in 1897